Hammarby IF Bandyförening is a Swedish bandy club from Södermalm, Stockholm, a section of the sports club Hammarby IF.

Hammarby IF was founded under its present name in 1897 and has been playing bandy since 1905. The club currently play in Elitserien, which is the highest division in Sweden, and has won it twice.

History
Hammarby IF Bandy is one of the oldest bandy clubs in Sweden, founded in 1905 as a department of sports club Hammarby IF. At this time, there were several other Stockholm teams who also played bandy – AIK, IFK Stockholm, Djurgårdens IF, IF Swithiod and Djursholm. The different teams played friendly matches and local tournaments.

In 1906, the Swedish Football Association took over the organization of bandy in Sweden. The Swedish championship premiered in 1907 but Hammarby IF failed to qualify for the play-offs until 1916. One year before, Hammarby had merged with Klara SK that provided a big supplement of talented players to the team. Another merge took place in 1918, when Johanneshovs IF joined Hammarby. At this time, Hammarby often played their home games at Hammarby IP in Södermalm, an area the club considers its heartland.

By the end of the 1920s, Hammarby IF had established themselves among the top bandy clubs in Sweden. In the first year of bandy league system in Sweden, 1930–31, Hammarby entered in Division 1 Norra together with AIK, IF Vesta, IFK Rättvik, IK Sirius, Skutskärs IF, SK Tirfing, and Västerås SK and finished 8th.

Since then, as of 2017, Hammarby has not dropped below either the highest or second highest division in Sweden.

In 1957, Hammarby reached their first Swedish championship final, but lost 1–2 to Örebro SK at Stockholms stadion.

Hammarby got relegated to the second division in 1979 and went on a hard struggle for several decades to come. There were even talks that the club would cease its operations. In 1995 Hammarby, however, won their promotion and returned to the top tier.

During the 2000s, Hammarby has achieved much success in both domestic and international competitions. Hammarby has been crowned World Champions three times: beating Ljusdals BK 7–0 in 1999, Sandvikens AIK 2–1 in 2001 and Zorky Krasnogorsk 6–2 in 2009.

They won the Swedish Cup, a knockout cup competition, for the first time in 2007, beating Sandviken in the final. They also won the cup back-to-back in 2013 and 2014.

Hammarby IF won their first national championship title in 2009–10 after beating Bollnäs GoIF in the final match at Studenternas IP. They also won the gold medal in 2013, beating Sandviken, as the final for the first time was played indoors at Friends Arena, that drew a record crowd of 38,474. The club ended as runners-up in the seasons of 1999–2000, 2000–01, 2002–03, 2003–04, 2005–06 and 2006–07.

The club was before the 2007–08 season in big economic problems and a campaign called "Rädda Hammarby Bandy" (save Hammarby Bandy) was set up. In the autumn of 2007 they became a joint-stock company and sold over 400 shares and they got over 2 million sek. Hammarby have strong links with fellow Stockholm-based club GT-76, with many players moving between the clubs.

Hammarby took part in an event in January 2018, where Prince William, Duke of Cambridge and Catherine, Duchess of Cambridge learned more about bandy during a visit to Stockholm.

Home ice
Hammarby play most of their home games at the outdoor rink Zinkensdamms IP, but some major home games are played at the new Tele2 Arena since 2014, for instance the home games in the Elitserien play-off 2014.

Squad

Notable players

List criteria:
 player has won at least two Swedish championships with Hammarby IF, or
 has been awarded the prize of Swedish Bandy Player of the Year by the Swedish Bandy Association while at the club, or
 has received the honorary award Stora Grabbars Märke from the Swedish Bandy Association playing the majority of their career at the club, or
 is a member of Hammarby IF's official Hall of Fame, or
 is a member of the Swedish Bandy Hall of Fame, starting or playing the majority of their career at the club.

Honours

Domestic
 Swedish Champions:
 Winners (2): 2010, 2013
 Runners-up (7): 1957, 2000, 2001, 2003, 2004, 2006, 2007

Cups
 Svenska Cupen:
 Winners (3): 2007, 2013, 2014
 Runners-up (3): 2009, 2011, 2012

International
 World Cup:
 Winners (3): 1999, 2001, 2009
 Runners-up (1): 2010

References

External links 
 Official website

 
Sport in Stockholm
Bandy clubs in Sweden
Bandy clubs established in 1897
1897 establishments in Sweden
Hammarby IF